Valea Părului may refer to several villages in Romania:

 Valea Părului, a village in Beceni Commune, Buzău County
 Valea Părului, a village in Mârzănești Commune, Teleorman County